Agustín Fernández Mallo (A Coruña, 1967) is a physicist and Spanish writer. He lives in Palma de Mallorca. He is a member of the so-called Nocilla Generation.

Although he works as a physicist, he also collaborates with cultural magazines such as Lateral, Contrastes, La Bolsa de Pipas, La fábrica and Anónima.

Works

Poetry 
 Yo siempre regreso a los pezones y al punto 7 del Tractatus (I Always Return To Nipples And Point 7 of the Tractatus), 2001
 Creta, lateral travelling, 2004
 Joan Fontaine Odisea (mi deconstrucción) (Joan Fontaine Odyssey (My Deconstruction)), 2005
 Carne de Píxel (Pixel Meat), 2008

Fiction 
 The Things We've Seen, 2021
 El hacedor (de Borges) Remake (The Maker (of Borges) Remake) (Unpublished)
 The Nocilla Trilogy
 Nocilla Dream, 2006
 Nocilla Experience, 2008
 Nocilla Lab, 2009
 Limbo, Alfaguara, 2014

Essays 
 Postpoesía. Hacia un nuevo paradigma, 2009

Prizes 
 First Prize Café Món for Creta, lateral travelling.
 Nocilla Dream was designated the best novel of the year in Spanish language by Quimera magazine.
 Nocilla Dream was chosen by the El Cultural supplement, of Spanish newspaper El Mundo, as one of the best ten novels of 2006.
 Carne de píxel, Ciudad de Burgos Poetry Award (2007)
 Premio Biblioteca Breve for Trilogía de la guerra (2018)

References

External links 

 El hombre que salió de la tarta · Agustín Fernández Mallo's Blog
 Interview with Agustín Fernández Mallo

21st-century Spanish novelists
21st-century Spanish poets
Living people
1967 births
Galician poets
Writers from Galicia (Spain)
People from A Coruña